Sedapatti is a neighborhood in Madurai district in the Indian State of Tamil Nadu.

Location

The coordinates of Sedapatti are: 9°49'19"N77°47'53"E. It is a village near Usilampatti which is a part of Madurai District in Tamil Nadu. Sedapatti (State Assembly Constituency) is based on this village.

Revenue Blocks 

This village is a part of one of the Revenue Blocks (Taluk) of Madurai District, which contains the following panchayat villages under it .
 Athankaraipatti	
 Athikaripatti	
 Athipatti
 Chinnakattalai	
 E. Kottaipatty	
 Kalappanpatti
 Kethuvarpatti
 Kudicheri
 Kudipatty
 Kuppalnatham
 Mallapuram	
 Melathirumanickam
 Muthunagaiapuram	
 Palaiyur	
 Pappinaickanpatty
 Peraiyampatty	
 Periakattalai	
 Perungamanallur
 Poosalpuram
 Saptoor Sedapatty
 Seelnaickanpatty	
 Sembarani	
 Soolapuram
 Thadaiyampatty	
 Thirumanickam	
 Thullukuttinaickanur
 Uthappuram
 Vandapuli	
 Vandari
 Veppampatty

Notable personalities 
Notable personalities connected to this place are,
 Sedapatti Muthiah
 S. S. Rajendran

Villages in Madurai district